Anatol Petrytsky  (January 31 (February 12), 1895 -March 6, 1964) was a Soviet painter, stage and book designer.

Biography
Petrytsky was born in the family of a railwayman. From 1912 to 1918, he studied at the Kiev Art School. Was an apprentice of Vasyl Krychevsky. At the same time, he studied at the studio of Alexander Murashko. In 1916, he debuted as a stage designer. He was Chief Artist of the Young Theater, Les Kurbas (1917-1919) and completed the majority of theatre performances, including "Autumn," "Candida," "Flooded Bell," and "Christmas Vertep."

In 1927, he was one of the founders (together with writers Geo Shkurupii, Dmitry Buzk, Leonid Skrypnyk, Oleksiy Poltoratsky, and Oleksii Vlizko, and artist Vadym Meller) of the futuristic organization "New Generation."

Petrytsky was the main artist of the First State Drama Theater of the Ukrainian SSR and the Ukrainian musical drama in Kyiv, and also designed books and magazines. He joined the literary associations White Studio (1918) and Flamingo (1919).

The painting "Disabled" by A. Petrytsky was presented at the Venice Biennale of 1930, received a high grade, and then traveled to America for several years as part of an exhibition of paintings, many of which were written by the European press. 

Petrytsky died on March 6, 1964, and was buried in Baykovoye Cemetery in Kiev. His tombstone was bronze, the work of sculptor G. N. Kalchenko, and installed in 1970.

More than 500 of Petrytsky's works of stage design belong to the collection of the Museum of Theatre, Music and Cinema of Ukraine. Additionally, some of his works are kept at the National Art Museum of Ukraine.

External links

D. Gorbachev. Anatol Petrytsky. Moscow, 1971

1895 births
1964 deaths
Artists from Kyiv
People from Kievsky Uyezd
20th-century Ukrainian painters
20th-century Ukrainian male artists
Ukrainian avant-garde
Burials at Baikove Cemetery
Ukrainian male painters